Lyuben Kostov (born 8 March 1935) is a former Bulgarian footballer. He was the top scorer of the 1960 championship (with 12 goals for Spartak Varna).

References

Player profile at portalfootball.net

1935 births
Living people
Bulgarian footballers
Bulgaria international footballers
PFC Cherno More Varna players
PFC Spartak Varna players
First Professional Football League (Bulgaria) players
Association football forwards